Ahmad Kemal Idris (10 February 1923 – 28 July 2010) was a prominent Indonesian Army general during the 1950s and 1960s. He was an Indonesian guerrilla leader during the Indonesian National Revolution, who in 1949 was involved in continued resistance to the Dutch forces after they occupied Yogyakarta.

Poncke Princen, the Dutch soldier who went over to the guerrillas, served under Idris's command.

Idris participated in the 17 October 1952 affair in which a group of Indonesian Army officers staged a failed coup attempt that would have forced the dissolution of the People's Representative Council (DPR, the parliament) and put President Sukarno as the supreme leader of Indonesia. As a consequence of his action, Idris failed to receive any significant promotion within the Army for 13 years.

In 1965–1966, Idris was  chief of staff of the Strategic Reserve Command (KOSTRAD), and had an important role in the overthrow of Sukarno and the rise  of General Suharto to power.

Nevertheless, by 1980 Idris had a falling out with Suharto and he was part of group of senior Indonesian retired generals and politicians to sign a petition highlighting their concerns against Suharto increasing authoritarian rule. This group was later known as the Petisi 50 group, highlighting the number of its signatories.

As a result of his involvement with Petisi 50, Idris and his colleagues were sidelined and isolated by the Suharto government. Nevertheless, he managed to set up a waste collection company in Jakarta, earning him the nickname of jenderal sampah ("waste general").

Idris died in Jakarta on 28 July 2010, due to complications from pneumonia.

Honour

Foreign honour
 : 
 Honorary Commander of the Order of Loyalty to the Crown of Malaysia (P.S.M.) - Tan Sri (1972)

References

1923 births
2010 deaths
People from Buleleng Regency
Indonesian generals
People of the Indonesian National Revolution
Minangkabau people
Deaths from pneumonia in Indonesia
Honorary Commanders of the Order of Loyalty to the Crown of Malaysia